The 10th Kentucky Infantry Regiment was an infantry regiment that served in the Union Army during the American Civil War.

Service
The 10th Kentucky Infantry Regiment was organized at Lebanon, Kentucky, and mustered in for a three-year enlistment on November 21, 1861 under the command of Colonel John Marshall Harlan.

The regiment was attached to:
 1861
 2nd Brigade, Army of the Ohio, to December 1861.
 1862
 2nd Brigade, 1st Division, Army of the Ohio, to September 1862.
 2nd Brigade, 1st Division, III Corps, Army of the Ohio, to November 1862.
 1863
 2nd Brigade, 3rd Division, Center, XIV Corps, Army of the Cumberland, to January 1863.
 2nd Brigade, 3rd Division, XIV Corps, to October 1863.
 1864
 3rd Brigade, 3rd Division, XIV Corps, to December 1864.

The 10th Kentucky Infantry mustered out of service on December 6, 1864.

Detailed service

1862
 Advance on Camp Hamilton, Kentucky, January 1–15, 1862.
 Action at Logan's Cross Roads on Fishing Creek January 19.
 Battle of Mill Springs January 19–20.
 Duty at Mill Springs until February 11.
 Moved to Louisville, then to Nashville, Tennessee February 11-March 2.
 March to Savannah, Tennessee March 20-April 7.
 Expedition to Bear Creek, Alabama April 12–13.
 Advance on and siege of Corinth, Mississippi April 29-May 30.
 Buell's Campaign in northern Alabama and middle Tennessee June to August.
 Courtland Bridge July 25 (Companies A and H).
 Decatur August 7.
 March to Nashville, Tennessee, then to Louisville, Kentucky, in pursuit of Bragg August 20-September 26.
 Pursuit of Bragg into Kentucky October 1–16.
 Battle of Perryville, October 8.

1863
 March to Gallatin, Tennessee, and duty there until January 13, 1863.
 Operations against Morgan December 22, 1862 to January 2, 1863.
 Moved to Nashville, Tennessee, January 13, 1863; then to Murfreesboro and duty there until June.
 Expedition toward Columbia March 4–14.
 Tullahoma Campaign June 23-July 7.
 Hoover's Gap June 24–26.
 Occupation of middle Tennessee until August 16.
 Passage of Cumberland Mountains and Tennessee River and Chickamauga Campaign August 16-September 22.
 Battle of Chickamauga September 19–21.
 Before Chattanooga September 22–26.
 Siege of Chattanooga September 26-November 23.
 Chattanooga-Ringgold Campaign November 23–27.
 Orchard Knob November 23–24.
 Missionary Ridge November 25.

1864
 Reconnaissance of Dalton, Georgia, February 22–27, 1864.
 Tunnel Hill, Buzzard's Roost Gap, and Rocky Faced Ridge February 23–25.
 Atlanta Campaign May 1-September 8.
 Demonstration on Rocky Faced Ridge and Dalton May 8–13.
 Buzzard's Roost Gap May 8–9.
 Battle of Resaca May 14–15.
 Advance on Dallas May 18–25.
 Operations on line of Pumpkin Vine Creek and battles about Dallas, New Hope Church, and Allatoona Hills May 25-June 5.
 Operations about Marietta and against Kennesaw Mountain June 10-July 2.
 Pine Hill June 11–14.
 Lost Mountain June 15–17.
 Near Marietta June 19.
 Assault on Kennesaw June 27.
 Ruff's Station July 4.
 Chattahoochie River July 5–17.
 Vining Station July 9–11.
 Peachtree Creek July 19–20.
 Siege of Atlanta July 22-August 25.
 Flank movement on Jonesboro August 25–30.
 Battle of Jonesboro August 31-September 1.
 Moved to Ringgold, Georgia, then to Chattanooga, Tennessee, and duty there until November.
 Ordered to Kentucky November 14.

Casualties
The regiment lost a total of 221 men during service; 2 officers and 70 enlisted men killed or mortally wounded, 5 officers and 144 enlisted men died of disease.

Commanders
 Colonel John Marshall Harlan  
 Colonel William Hercules Hays
 Lieutenant Colonel Gabriel Caldwell Wharton

Notable members
 Colonel John Marshall Harlan - associate justice of the Supreme Court of the United States
 Private Henry B. Mattingly, Company B - Medal of Honor recipient for action at the Battle of Jonesboro, September 1, 1864

See also

 List of Kentucky Civil War Units
 Kentucky in the Civil War

Notes/references

Bibliography

External links
 Alphabetical roster of the 10th Kentucky taken from Thomas Speed's Union Regiments of Kentucky
 Site dedicated to the history of the 10th Kentucky Infantry 

Military units and formations established in 1861
Military units and formations disestablished in 1864
Units and formations of the Union Army from Kentucky
1861 establishments in Kentucky